All I Want for Christmas Is You, a Night of Joy and Festivity was the second concert residency by American singer-songwriter Mariah Carey. Originally performed annually at the Beacon Theatre in Manhattan, New York, the residency began on December 15, 2014, and ended on December 15, 2019, after completing eight legs and fifty-six shows in various countries around the world. The main set list for the show encompassed songs from Merry Christmas and Merry Christmas II You, alongside additional non-holiday tracks from Carey's discography.

Background and development
Mariah Carey released her fourteenth studio album, titled Me. I Am Mariah... The Elusive Chanteuse, on May 27, 2014. It debuted at number three on the Billboard 200 album chart with opening week sales of 58,000 copies in the United States, and number one on the Top R&B/Hip-Hop Albums chart. Carey embarked on her eighth concert tour called The Elusive Chanteuse Show in October and November later that year, whereby she performed concerts throughout East Asia, South East Asia and Australasia. During the Australasian leg, Carey announced that she would take up residency at the Beacon Theatre in the New York City borough of Manhattan to be performed annually in December, as a twentieth anniversary celebration of the release of her first Christmas album, Merry Christmas, in 1994, as well as her second Christmas album, Merry Christmas II You (2010). Carey said in an announcement "I can't imagine being anywhere more special than live on stage, in my hometown, celebrating with my fans during the Christmas season, my most treasured time of the year, I can't wait!"

Critical reception
Jim Farber of the New York Daily News stated that while Carey "seemed nervous and out-of-breath," the show had "a strange allure." Steven J. Horowitz from Billboard praised the singer's first performance at the venue, writing: "Carey accomplished what she came to do: spread Christmas cheer." Jon Caramanica from The New York Times who also reviewed the first show wrote the singer felt "utterly at ease" and commended her engagement with the audience.

Commercial performance
Following the announcement of the residency in October 2014, tickets for shows on December 15, 16, 18 and 20 went on pre-sale on November 3 for Citigroup cardholders, while general release followed a week later on November 10. Additional dates for December 21 and 22 were later released. Billboard later announced that the six dates generated a 100% attendance, with Carey playing to a total of 16,196 people and the shows grossing $1,563,173 in total.

In October 2015, a new string of dates were announced once again at the Beacon Theatre with tickets available on October 17 via Ticketmaster.

Set list 

 "Sugar Plum Fairy Introlude" (Ballet Introduction)
 "Hark! The Herald Angels Sing" / "Gloria (In Excelsis Deo)"
 "Charlie Brown Christmas"
 "Fantasy" (Interlude)
 "Oh Santa!"
 "Christmas (Baby Please Come Home)"
 "Santa Claus Is Comin' to Town" / "Rudolph the Red-Nosed Reindeer" / "Jingle Bells" (Children's Choir Interlude)
 "Jesus Oh What a Wonderful Child" (Interlude) (Performed by Trey Lorenz and choir) 
 "Silent Night" 
 "Joy to the World" 
 "This Christmas" (Band Interlude)
 "When Christmas Comes"
 "Here Comes Santa Claus (Right Down Santa Claus Lane) / Housetop Celebration"
"I Saw Mommy Kissing Santa Claus" (Children's Choir Interlude)
 "Carol of the Bells" (Dance Interlude) (contains elements from "Sing We Now of Christmas")
 "Christmas Time Is in the Air Again"
 "O Holy Night"
 "Emotions"
 "We Belong Together"
 "Hero"
Encore
 "All I Want for Christmas Is You"
 "All I Want for Christmas Is You Reprise" (Outro)

Shows

Cancelled shows

References

2014 concert residencies
2015 concert residencies
2016 concert residencies
2017 concert residencies
2018 concert residencies
Mariah Carey concert residencies
Christmas music
2019 concert residencies